Domenico Lazzarini (18 August 1668 – 1734) was an Italian prelate, classical professor of Latin and Greek, playwright and poet, working mainly in Padua.

Biography 
He was born in Morro di Valle near Macerata. He studied at the Jesuit College in Macerata, graduating in 1687 with a doctorate in philosophy, theology, and jurisprudence in utroque iure At this young age, he was admitted to the Accademia Catenati de Macerata. He was admired for his erudition in both Latin and Greek, and in 1690 appointed to a professorship in Macerata. In 1703, he was elected Auditore della Rota in Macerata. He found some detractors in his native town, and found refuge in Bologna under the protection of Cardinal Lorenzo Casoni (1645–1720), legate to Bologna. In 1711, the Venetian Senate recruited him to teach Greek and Latin at the University of Padua. In 1712, he had been inducted a member of the Accademia dei Ricovrati of Padua. He taught in Padua as professor for 23 years until his death.

He wrote an erudite play Ulisse il Giovanni.

References

1668 births
1734 deaths
18th-century Italian writers
Italian humanists
People from Macerata